Brook Farm in Thornton-Cleveleys, Lancashire, England, was built in 1892. At that time, it was one of the only properties in the area on what was then its farmland. Its earliest known reference (erroneously named Brooks Farm Cottages) in literature is in the 1918 edition of The London Gazette in 1918. In the 1915 edition of The Dairy periodical, a Mrs. S. A. Keirby is stated as owning a dairy farm here.

Originally a standalone building, two bays wide, it was extended to the west in the mid–20th century, adding two properties.

Several hundred houses were built on and around its former farmland in the late 20th century, on land abutting the former site of Imperial Chemical Industries which is known to be contaminated.

Detail

References

1892 establishments in England
Houses completed in 1892
Farmhouses in England
Buildings and structures in the Borough of Wyre
The Fylde